Yuri I of Galicia (24 April 1252 (1257?) – 18 March 1308) was a King of Ruthenia, Prince of Volhynia (Latin: Regis Rusie, Princeps Ladimerie). His full title was Yuri I, King of Ruthenia, Grand Prince of Kyiv, Volodymyr, Halych, Lutsk, Dorohochyn.

Overview
In 1264-1301 he was a prince of the Duchy of Belz.

He was a son of Leo I of Galicia (also known as Lev Danylovych) and Constance of Hungary, a daughter of King Béla IV of Hungary.

He married three times. His first wife was Yaroslavna of Tver (died ca. 1286). His second  wife was Euphemia of Kuyavia (died 18 March 1308), daughter of Casimir I of Kuyavia. His third wife is unknown.

Family 

Sons

 Mykhailo (1283–1286) (first marriage)
 Andrew of Galicia, Prince of Ruthenia (1308–1323)
 Lev II, Prince of Ruthenia (1308–1323)
 Dmytro, Lord of Ruthenia (1340-1349)

Daughters

 Maria, Princess of Ruthenia, (died 11 January 1341). Married Trojden I of Masovia
 Anastasia (parentage uncertain; died 1364–1365). Married Alexander I of Tver (died 1339)

Ancestry

See also 
 List of Ukrainian rulers

References

Further reading
 Bilynsky, V. Ukraine-Ruthenia. Book I: Ancestral land. "Olena Teliha publishing". Kiev 2013. 

1250s births
1308 deaths
Kings of Rus'
Romanovichi family
House of Árpád
Eastern Orthodox monarchs